Mar Dionysius III, also known as Punnathra Mar Dionysius and born Kurien (1785 – 19 May 1825) was 11th Malankara Metropolitan and  Successor to the Holy Apostolic Throne of St.Thomas from 1817 until his death. 
Dionysius had a long career in the Malankara Church prior to his consecration as Metropolitan. It was his suggestion during the time of Mar Thoma IX to establish the Syrian seminary at Kottayam, Kerala's first educational institution. He also welcomed some of the first missionary teachers who arrived from England to teach in the seminary. In 1816, following the demise of Mar Dionysius II, who had not appointed a successor, Kurien was elected to succeed him as the Malankara Metropolitan by the general assembly of the Church (Malankara Palliyogam) and was ordained as bishop by Geevarghese Mar Philexenos II of the Malabar Independent Syrian Church.

Early days
Kurien, who later became Mar Dionysious, was born in 1785 in the well known Punnathara family, Kottayam. Soon after his ordination he was appointed as a priest in his home parish Kallumkathra. As a representative of his parish he attended a number of meetings connected with the establishment of the Syrian Seminary.

Primate of the Church

Consecration
Following the sudden demise of Pulikkottil Joseph Mar Dionysious I, on 24 November 1816, the British resident called a meeting of the Diwan (prime minister) of Travancore and elders of the church at Ernakulam.  This meeting decided to appoint Geevarghese Mar Philexenos (Kidangan) (1811–29) of the Malabar Independent Syrian Church, who consecrated Pulikottil Joseph Mar Dionysius in 1816, to be the Acting Malankara Metropolitan. This was accepted and Maharajahas of both Travancore and Cochin issued royal proclamations to confirm this.

Geevarghese Mar Philexenos II did not want to take over the Malankara church. He convened a general assembly of the representatives of the parishes and they selected Punnathara Kurien Kathanar as the next Metropolitan. Kurien Kathanar handed over the responsibilities of Kallumkathra parish to Kaithayil Geevarghese Malpan.

Punnathra Kurien Ramban was ordained by Mar Philexenos (Kidangan) of the Malabar Independent Syrian Church on 19 October 1817.

Mavelikkara assembly
Punnathra Mar Dionysius was pressurised by Angilican missionaries who wanted to reform the Malankara Church. A meeting was held on 3 December 1818 at Mavelikkara to study the changes that can be implemented with the missionaries present. To suggest improvements to be made in the church, a six-member committee was appointed. Palakunnathu Abraham Malpan, Konattu Varghese Malpan, and Kaithayil Geevarghese Malpan were among them.

English missionaries
Anglican missionaries began to arrive in Kerala. Rev. Thomas Norton arrived in Kochi on 8 May 1816, and began to open schools in and around Alappuzha. Rev. Benjamin Baily arrived in October 1816 and established a printing press at the Syrian Seminary in Kottayam. He also began to translate the Bible into Malayalam. During the time of Punnathara Mar Dionysious Rev. Joseph Fenn arrived in 1818 October and was made the principal. Rev. Henry Baker arrived in 1819 April went round the parishes establishing schools near the churches. The Anglican missionaries maintained cordial relations with the Malankara Church during the reign of Mar Dionysius III, assisting in the theological education at the Seminary without interfering in the faith and administration of the Church.

The letter to the C.M.S.
An apologetic version of the Coonan Cross Oath in the letter of Dionysious Punnathara to the head of the Anglican Church Missionary Society from a translation of it out of the Syriac original:

Here, the oath is presented as an opposition to the Pope himself.

Relation with Travancore
During the time of Punnathara Mar Dionysious the relation with Travancore and Cochin was very cordial. The Ruler of Travancore Maharani Gowri Parvati Bayi, gave a number of privileges to the Seminary. For the first time in Travancore in 1818, Maha Rani appointed a number Christians as Judges.

Last days
By 1825 there was an outbreak of Cholera in Kerala. A number of people lost their lives. Due to this disease, Punnathara Mar Dionysious died on 17 May 1825 and was interred at Kottayam Cheriapally (St. Mary's Orthodox Church). The memorial feast of Mar Dionysius III is observed on 19 May.

See also
Malankara Marthoma Syrian Church
Indian Orthodox Church
Syrian Malabar Nasrani
Saint Thomas Christians
List of Catholicoi of the East and Malankara Metropolitans
List of Syrian Malabar Nasranis
Mar Dionysius II
Mar Dionysius IV
Geevarghese Mar Philexenos II

References

Further reading
Ittoop Writer (1906). Malayalathulla Suryani Chistianikauleday Charitram (History of Syrian Christians in the land of Malayalam).

Oriental Orthodoxy in India
Christian clergy from Kottayam
Saint Thomas Christians
Metropolitans of the Mar Thoma Syrian Church
1825 deaths
1785 births
Malankara Orthodox Syrian Church
Malankara Orthodox Syrian Church bishops
Malankara Orthodox Syrian Church Christians